Amblytelus is a genus of ground beetle including 47 species distributed through southern Australia, including the Southwest and along the east coast up to North Queensland. It contains the following species:

 Amblytelus balli Baehr, 2004
 Amblytelus barringtonensis Baehr, 2004
 Amblytelus bathurstensis Baehr, 2004
 Amblytelus bellorum Baehr, 2004
 Amblytelus bistriatus Baehr, 2004
 Amblytelus brevis Blackburn, 1892
 Amblytelus brunnicolor Sloane, 1898
 Amblytelus calderi Baehr, 2004
 Amblytelus castaneus Baehr, 2004
 Amblytelus cooki Baehr, 2004
 Amblytelus curtus (Fabricius, 1801)
 Amblytelus discoidalis Blackburn, 1891
 Amblytelus doyeni Baehr, 2004
 Amblytelus fallax Baehr, 2006
 Amblytelus geoffreyorum Baehr, 2004
 Amblytelus gloriosus Baehr, 2004
 Amblytelus handkei Baehr, 2004
 Amblytelus inornatus Blackburn, 1891
 Amblytelus karricola Baehr, 2004
 Amblytelus lawrencei Baehr, 2004
 Amblytelus leai Sloane, 1898
 Amblytelus longior Baehr, 2004
 Amblytelus longipennis Baehr, 2004
 Amblytelus marginicollis Sloane, 1911
 Amblytelus matthewsi Baehr, 2004
 Amblytelus meyeri Baehr, 2004
 Amblytelus minutus Macleay, 1871
 Amblytelus monteithi Baehr, 2004
 Amblytelus montiscampi Baehr, 2004
 Amblytelus montiswilsoni Baehr, 2004
 Amblytelus montorum Baehr, 2004
 Amblytelus neboissi Baehr, 2004
 Amblytelus niger Sloane, 1920
 Amblytelus observatorum Baehr, 2004
 Amblytelus pseudepelyx Baehr, 2004
 Amblytelus rugosifrons Baehr, 2004
 Amblytelus simsoni Sloane, 1920
 Amblytelus sinuatus Blackburn, 1892
 Amblytelus spurgeoni Baehr, 2004
 Amblytelus striatus Sloane, 1920
 Amblytelus temporalis Baehr, 2004
 Amblytelus walfordi Baehr, 2004
 Amblytelus weiri Baehr, 2004

References

External links

New species and new records of the amblyteline genera Amblytelus Erichson and Dystrichothorax Blackbur from eastern Australia

 
Carabidae genera